The discography of American musician Moby consists of twenty-one studio albums, one live album, twelve compilation albums, eleven remix albums, three video albums, four extended plays, seventy-two singles, ninety-six music videos, and four remixes.

Albums

Studio albums

Live albums

Compilation albums

Remix albums

Video releases

Extended plays

Singles

Promotional singles

Other charted songs

Music videos

Remixes

Notes

References

External links
 
 
 

Discography
Discographies of American artists
Rock music discographies
Electronic music discographies